President Ashraf Ghani's cabinet was the cabinet of Afghanistan from 29 September 2014 until 15 August 2021.

Cabinet

References

2010s in Afghanistan
Executive branch of the government of Afghanistan
2014 establishments in Afghanistan